Jack Saunders (born 24 September 1992)
is a British radio DJ and TV presenter. He is best known for presenting his shows on BBC Radio 1.

Career

Radio
Saunders studied Broadcast Journalism at Nottingham Trent University, graduating in 2014. He managed the university's student radio station, during which time it won seven student radio awards.

Starting in June 2014, Saunders hosted the 10am to 1pm Sunday slot on Kerrang! Radio. He started at Radio X in 2015, hosting the early weekend breakfast show. He went on to cover various shows, including The Chris Moyles Show, and then hosted the mid-morning slot until April 2018. Toby Tarrant took over hosting the slot. 

In September 2018, Saunders began hosting the 11pm-1am slot on BBC Radio 1. The show focuses on rock, indie, and alternative music. In September 2020, the show moved an hour earlier at 10pm-12am, as part of a wider timetable change. Mondays to Wednesdays are devoted to Future Artists, whilst Thursdays are devoted to the Indie Show. In September 2021, the show moved two hours earlier to 8pm-10pm to take over from Rickie, Melvin and Charlie, who since moved to the Live Lounge slot. In July 2022, it was announced that Saunders would be the new host of The Official Chart, taking over from Scott Mills, who left for BBC Radio 2. At the same time, Saunders' Indie Show moved to Sundays at 9pm instead of Thursday at 8pm, where it was replaced by the Future Pop show with Mollie King. 

In July 2022 Saunders joined up with The Prodigy as a support DJ for the bands comeback UK Tour which included dates in Sheffield, Liverpool and Birmingham.

Television
Saunders also works as a presenter on MTV. He is the host of the weekly MTV Rocks Chart on MTV Music.

In 2019, Saunders and Yungblud featured together on an episode of Celebrity Gogglebox.

Streaming 
During the COVID-19 pandemic in 2020, Saunders started Quarantine Karaoke on Twitch. The series sees artists join him for interviews and karaoke. Since then, he set up a weekly thing called Feedback Friday, a commentary on the best new music, airing Fridays on Twitch.

Personal life 
Saunders is a fan of Arsenal F.C. and lives in Shenfield, Essex with his dog Winnie.

References

External links
Radio 1's Future Artists with Jack Saunders (BBC Radio 1)
The Official Chart on Radio 1 with Jack Saunders (BBC Radio 1)
Radio 1's Indie Show with Jack Saunders (BBC Radio 1)

BBC Radio 1 presenters
Living people
Alumni of Nottingham Trent University
Twitch (service) streamers
1992 births
Alumni of the Student Radio Association
Top of the Pops presenters